The 2016 Irving Tennis Classic was a professional tennis tournament played on hard courts. It was the fifth edition of the tournament which was part of the 2016 ATP Challenger Tour. It took place in Irving, Texas, United States between 12 and 20 March 2016.

Singles main-draw entrants

Seeds

 1 Rankings as of March 7, 2016

Other entrants
The following players received wildcards into the singles main draw:
  Ryan Harrison
  Dmitry Tursunov
  Frances Tiafoe
  Gilles Müller

The following players entered the main draw as alternates:
  Benjamin Becker
  Michael Berrer
  Jared Donaldson
  Rogério Dutra Silva
  Jozef Kovalík
  Andrey Rublev
  John-Patrick Smith
  Tim Smyczek
  Mischa Zverev

The following players received entry from the qualifying draw:
  Jason Jung
  Jakob Sude
  Philipp Petzschner
  Cameron Norrie

The following players entered the singles main draw as lucky losers:
  Nicolás Lapentti
  Michael Venus

Champions

Singles

  Marcel Granollers def.  Aljaž Bedene, 6–1, 6–1

Doubles

  Nicholas Monroe /  Aisam-ul-Haq Qureshi def.  Chris Guccione /  André Sá, 6–2, 5–7, [10–4]

References

External links
Official Website

Irving Tennis Classic
Irving Tennis Classic